Gonibregmatidae are a paraphyletic (with respect to Neogeophilidae and Eriphantidae) family of soil centipedes belonging to the superfamily Geophiloidea. Centipedes in this family are found in Madagascar, India, southeast Asia, and Australasia, and on islands in the Pacific ocean. The number of leg-bearing segments in this family varies within species and ranges from 57 to 191. These centipedes are very elongated with a high mean number of trunk segments (often greater than 100) and great variability in this number within species. This family includes the species Gonibregmatus plurimipes, which can have as many as 191 leg pairs, the maximum number found in the class Chilopoda.

Genera:
 Disargus Cook, 1896
 Gonibregmatus Newport, 1843
 Himantosoma Pocock, 1891
 Sogophagus Chamberlin, 1912
 Vinaphilus

References

Geophilomorpha